Anatoliy Kobrisev is a Soviet sprint canoer who competed in the early to mid-1970s. He won four medals in the K-1 4 x 500 m event at the ICF Canoe Sprint World Championships with two golds (1970, 1973), a silver (1974), and a bronze (1971).

References

Living people
Soviet male canoeists
Year of birth missing (living people)
ICF Canoe Sprint World Championships medalists in kayak